Operation Ogre is an adventure for fantasy role-playing games published by Judges Guild in 1979.

Contents
Operation Ogre is the official 1979 Pacificon AD&D tournament dungeon. The player characters must free an elven princess captured by the Ice Ogres. It describes an alchemist's laboratory in detail.

Publication history
Operation Ogre was written by Michael Mayeau, with a cover by Kevin Siembieda, and was published by Judges Guild in 1979 as a 32-page book.

Reception
Don Turnbull reviewed Operation Ogre for White Dwarf #17, and rated it a 5 out of 10. Turnbull commented: "the module itself isn't all that bad. Deliberately limited in scope so that eight teams could 'run' through it individually, with a maximum of four hours playing time each, it is built for speed and is a blood-and-guts dungeon in style rather than belonging to the problem-solving, more intellectually demanding type".

Reviews
 Different Worlds #6 (Dec 1979)

References

Judges Guild fantasy role-playing game adventures
Role-playing game supplements introduced in 1979